"Every One of Us" is a song by English singer and songwriter Rick Astley. It was released as a digital download in the United Kingdom on 12 September 2019 as the lead single from his greatest hits album The Best of Me (2019). The song was written and produced by Astley.

Background
When talking about the song, Astley said in a press release, "It's about the fire in all of us. We all have something to give, even if it doesn't always feel like we do. I'm so lucky to feel that fire every time I'm on stage, and that helps me feel it in my everyday life too."

On 22 September 2020, Astley released a version of the song for the Unsung Heroes and Children in Need.

Charts

Release history

References

2019 songs
2019 singles
Rick Astley songs
Songs written by Rick Astley